Chris Spence (born June 1970) is a British / New Zealand author, journalist and advisor on climate change and other environmental issues. He has worked internationally on sustainable development, conservation, climate change, and health policy. In 2005, his first non-fiction book, Global Warming: Personal Solutions for a Healthy Planet, was published, offering a description of climate change and a practical guide to the solutions. Other books include Rock Happy, a novel published in 2021 with strong dystopian and environmental themes, and Heroes of Environmental Diplomacy (2022), a non-fiction book on the roles of individuals in global diplomacy co-edited with author and futurist Felix Dodds. The book was published by Routledge. Each chapter follows one or more heroic individuals who have excelled in the area of environmental diplomacy, a list which includes Luc Hoffmann, Mostafa Tolba, Maria Luiza Ribeiro Viotti,  Raul Oyuela Estrada, Barack Obama and Paula Caballero.

Biography
Spence was born in 1970 in the city of Wakefield in Yorkshire, England and raised in nearby Bingley. His family moved to Wellington, New Zealand when he was 12, where he attended Wellington College and later Victoria University of Wellington, graduating with BA and MA degrees in political science and history. He is married with three children.

Career
In the 1990s, Spence worked as a political researcher in the Labour Research Unit of the New Zealand parliament at the time when Helen Clark was leader of the Labour Party. He later worked as a journalist for Consumer magazine in New Zealand, where he won the TUANZ award for best article on technology. In 1997, Spence became the youngest ever executive director of the New Zealand Drug Foundation, a public health advocacy/education group.

In 1998, Spence left New Zealand and eventually moved to New York, where his professional focus shifted to international diplomacy, particularly the United Nations negotiations on climate change and other environmental law issues. He worked as a consultant and advisor for a range of international organizations, including the International Institute for Sustainable Development (IISD) where he was recruited by Langston J. Goree VI (Kimo) the founder of the Earth Negotiations Bulletin.He also consulted for the United Nations Development Programme (UNDP). From 2005 to 2012, Spence was deputy director of IISD's Earth Negotiations Bulletin, leading teams of experts at many United Nations climate change negotiations and other meetings. In 2012, Spence moved to the West Coast to live in California.

In 2012, Spence joined the Golden Gate National Parks Conservancy in San Francisco, running their policy and innovation team and later becoming Executive Vice President for Strategy and Partnerships. In this role, he oversaw five departments and a large staff responsible for ensuring Golden Gate National Parks delivered inspiring programs and park experiences to the community. He left in 2018 to resume his writing, environmental consulting and musical interests with a new band, TDK.

Spence has authored and co-authored several books. His book Global Warming: Personal Solutions for a Healthy Planet was published in 2005. It drew from Spence's experiences with the International Institute for Sustainable Development, and took issue with the Bush Administration's climate change policies. Spence has also been published in the American British Business Magazine, the New York Daily News, and Discover magazine.

Personal life

In 2020, after two decades in the United States, Spence moved with his family to Dublin, Ireland, where he continues working as a writer and an environmental consultant. Spence returns on a regular basis to New Zealand, a country with which he developed a great affinity in his youth, and where he has family. He is married with three children.

References

External links
 International Institute for Sustainable Development Reporting Services
 Institute at the Golden Gate
 Interview with Spence as Director of the Institute at the Golden Gate

1970 births
British writers
People educated at Wellington College (New Zealand)
Living people
People from Bingley
Victoria University of Wellington alumni